John Frederick Vermillion (April 1, 1922–September 20, 2021) was an American politician and newspaper publisher who served in the Kansas House of Representatives and Kansas State Senate.

Vermillion was born in Osawatomie, Kansas and moved with his family to Independence, Kansas in 1926. He earned an associate's degree and then served in the U.S. Navy during World War II. He was discharged and returned to Kansas in 1945, marrying Bonnie May Price in 1946 and becoming a father of four. Vermillion owned and published a newspaper, the Independence Weekly News.

In 1956, he ran for the Kansas House of Representatives and won, serving two terms from 1957 to 1960. He left the state legislature, but returned in the 1968 election, when he ran for the Kansas Senate, serving one term in the 10th Senate district and two additional terms in the 15th after redistricting. He continued publishing his paper until July 2021.

References

1922 births
2021 deaths
Republican Party Kansas state senators
Republican Party members of the Kansas House of Representatives
Kansas Republicans
20th-century American politicians
People from Independence, Kansas
20th-century American newspaper publishers (people)
United States Navy personnel of World War II
People from Osawatomie, Kansas